This list of American films of 1918 is a compilation of American films that were released in the year 1918.

A–B

C–D

E–F

G–H

I–J

K–L

M–N

O–P

Q–R

S–T

U–V

W–Z

Documentaries

Shorts

See also 
 1918 in the United States

References

External links 

 1918 films at the Internet Movie Database

1918
Films
Lists of 1918 films by country or language
1910s in American cinema